Kharagpur subdivision is an administrative subdivision of Paschim Medinipur district in the state of West Bengal, India.

Subdivisions
Paschim Medinipur district is divided into the following administrative subdivisions, after separation of Jhargram subdivision from the district in 2017:

Kharagpur subdivision has a population density of 787 per km2. 48.02% of the total population of the district resides in this subdivision.

Administrative units
Kharagpur subdivision has 10 police stations, 10 community development blocks, 10 panchayat samitis, 99 gram panchayats, 2,679 mouzas, 2486 inhabited villages, 1 municipality and 5 census towns. The single municipality is at Kharagpur. The census towns are: Balichak, Chaulia, Deuli, Kharagpur Railway Settlement and Kalaikunda. The subdivision has its headquarters at Kharagpur.

Police stations
Police stations in Kharagpur subdivision have the following features and jurisdiction:

Gram panchayats
The subdivision contains 99 gram panchayats under 10 community development blocks:

 Dantan I block: Ainkola, Chak Ismailpur, Monoharpur, Alikosha, Dantan–I, Salikotha, Angua, Datan–II and Tarurui.
 Dantan II block: Haripur, Porolda, Sauri Kotbar, Turka, Jenkapur, Sabra and Talda.
 Pingla block: Dhaneswarpur, Jalchak–II, Kshirai, Pindurui, Gobordhanpur, Jamna, Kusumda, Jalchak–I, Karkai and Maligram.
 Kharagpur I block: Arjuni, Gopali, Kalaikunda, Vetia, Barkola, Hariatara and Khelarh.
 Kharagpur II block: Chakmakampur, Kaliara–II, Paparara–I, Changual, Lachhmapur, Paparara–II, Kaliara–I, Palsya and Sankoa.
 Sabang block: Balpai, Danrra, Nawgaon, Bhemua, Bishnupur, Dashgram, Narayanbarh,  Bural, Debhog, Sabang,  Chaulkuri, Mohar and Sharta.
 Mohanpur block: Mohanpur, Sautia, Tanua, Neelda and Shialsai.
 Narayangarh block: Bakhrabad, Hemchandra, Manya, Pakurseni, Belda–I, Khursi, Mokrampur, Ranisarai, Belda–II, Kunarpur, Narayangarh, Tutranga, Gramraj, Kushbasan, Narma and Kashipur.
 Keshiari block: Baghasthi, Keshiari, Lalua, Gaganeswar, Khajra, Nachipur, Ghritagram, Kusumpur and Santrapur.
 Debra block: Bhabanipur, Duan–I, Khanamohan, Satyapur, Bharatpur, Duan–II, Malighati, Snarpur–Loyada, Debra–I, Golgram, Radhamohanpur–I,  Debra–II, Jalimanda, Radhamohanpur–II.

Blocks
Community development blocks in Kharagpur subdivision are:

Education
Paschim Medinipur district had a literacy rate of 78.00%  as per the provisional figures of the census of India 2011. Medinipur Sadar subdivision had a literacy rate of 76.23%, Kharagpur subdivision 80.51% and Ghatal subdivision 82.55%.  

Given in the table below (data in numbers) is a subdivision-wise comprehensive picture of the education scenario in Paschim Medinipur district, after separation of Jhargram subdivision, for the year 2013-14.

Note: Primary schools include junior basic schools; middle schools, high schools and higher secondary schools include madrasahs; technical schools include junior technical schools, junior government polytechnics, industrial technical institutes, industrial training centres, nursing training institutes etc.; technical and professional colleges include engineering colleges, medical colleges, para-medical institutes, management colleges, teachers training and nursing training colleges, law colleges, art colleges, music colleges etc. Special and non-formal education centres include sishu siksha kendras, madhyamik siksha kendras, adult high schools, centres of Rabindra mukta vidyalaya, recognised Sanskrit tols, institutions for the blind and other handicapped persons, Anganwadi centres, reformatory schools etc.

The following institutions are located in Kharagpur subdivision:

Indian Institute of Technology at Kharagpur was established in 1951.
Kharagpur College at Kharagpur was established in 1949.
Keshiary Government College at Keshiary established in 2015.
Hijli College at Hijli was established in 1995.
Government General Degree College, Kharagpur-II at Ambigere, Madpur, in Kharagpur II CD Block was established in 2015.
Belda College was established in 1963 at Belda.
Debra Thana Sahid Kshudiram Smriti Mahavidyalaya was established in 2006 at Gangaram Chak.
Pingla Thana Mahavidyalaya was established in 1965 at Maligram.
Bhatter College was established in 1963 at Dantan.
Sabang Sajani Kanta Mahavidyalaya at Lutunia was established in 1970.
 Government General Degree College, Dantan-II was established at Kashmuli in 2015.
Government General Degree College, Mohanpur was established in 2015.
Government General Degree College, Narayangarh was established in 2017 at Narayangarh.

Healthcare
The table below (all data in numbers) presents an overview of the subdivision-wise medical facilities available and patients treated, after the separation of Jhargram, in the hospitals, health centres and sub-centres in 2014 in Paschim Medinipur district.  
 

Excluding Nursing Homes

Medical facilities
Medical facilities in the Kharagpur subdivision are as follows:

Hospitals: (Name, location, beds) 
Kharagpur Subdivisional Hospital, Kharagpur (M), 286 beds
Kharagpur Railway Hospital, Kharagpur, 394 beds
B.C.Roy Technology Hospital (IIT), Kharagpur, 35 beds
Kharagpur E.F.R. Hospital, Kharagpur, 75 beds
State Medical Unit, Kharagpur, 10 beds
IPP VIII, Kharagpur, 10 beds

Rural Hospitals: (Name, CD block, location, beds) 
Hijli Rural Hospital, Kharagpur I CD block, Hijli, 60 beds
Sabang Rural Hospital, Sabang CD block, Sabang,  40 beds
Debra Rural Hospital, Debra CD block, Debra Bazar, 40 beds
Belda Rural Hospital, Narayangarh CD block, Belda, 60 beds
Bagda (Mohanpur) Rural Hospital, Mohanpur CD block, Mohanpur, 30 beds
Pingla Rural Hospital, Pingla CD block, Pingla, 30 beds
Keshiary Rural Hospital, Keshiari CD block, Keshiary, 30 beds
Khandrui Rural Hospital, Dantan II CD block, Khandrui, PO Turkagarh, 30 beds

Block Primary Health Centres: (Name, CD block, location, beds)
Changual Block Primary Health Centre,  Kharagpur II CD block, Changual, 10 beds
Dantan Block Primary Health Centre, Dantan I CD block, Dantan, 10 beds

Primary Health Centres : (CD block-wise)(CD block, PHC location, beds)
Kharagpur I CD block: Khemasuli (4), Amba (PO Shyamraipur) (2), Khelar (PO Banpatna) (10)
Kharagpur II CD block: Gokulpur (PO Bar Gokulpur) (6), Paparara (10)
Sabang CD block: Mohor (10), Kharika (10), Uchitpur (4)
Narayangarh CD block: Barakalonki (6), Radhanagar (6), Makrampur (10), Begunia (?)
Mohanpur CD block: Sautia (6), Ghatsandhya (PO Begunia) (10)
Debra CD block: Satyapur (PO Marotala) (6), Pasang (10), Trilochanpur (PO Sijgeria) (6), Kankra Shibrampur (PO Kankra Ataram) (6)
Pingla CD block: Jalchak (10), Harma (PO Gobardhanpur) (6), Boalia (PO Dhaneswarpur) (6)
Keshiary CD block: Patharhuri (PO Binandapur (6), Khajrabari (PO Khejurkuthi) (10), Ganasarisa (2)
Dantan I CD block: Bhuringi (PO Anikole) (2), Rajnagar (10)
Dantan II CD block: Sabradhaneswarpur (PO Khakurda) (4), Payan (PO Garh Haripur) (10)

Electoral constituencies
Lok Sabha (parliamentary) and Vidhan Sabha (state assembly) constituencies in Paschim Medinipur district were as follows from 2006:

References

Subdivisions of West Bengal
Subdivisions in Paschim Medinipur district
Paschim Medinipur district